Journal of Research in Special Education Needs is a peer-reviewed academic journal published thrice annually by Wiley-Blackwell on behalf of the National Association for Special Educational Needs. The journal was established in 2001 and covers research on special education needs.

External links 
 

Special education journals
English-language journals
Publications established in 1978
Special education
Wiley-Blackwell academic journals
Triannual journals